"I Won't Cry" is a song written by Lasse Anderson, and recorded by Elin Lanto. It was released in 2004. as her debut single, it topped the Swedish singles chart.

Other recordings
In 2008, the song was recorded by Emilia Rydberg.

Track listing
"I Won't Cry"
"I Won't Cry" (CHR-remix)
"I Won't Cry" (karaokeversion)

Charts

Weekly charts

Year-end charts

References 

2004 singles
2004 songs
Elin Lanto songs
Emilia Rydberg songs
English-language Swedish songs
Songs written by Lasse Anderson
Number-one singles in Sweden